Wilfrid Laurier University Press, based in Waterloo, Ontario, is a publisher of scholarly writing and is part of Wilfrid Laurier University. The fourth-largest university press in Canada, WLUP publishes work in a variety of disciplines in the humanities and social sciences — literary criticism, indigenous studies, sociology, environmental studies, and history among them — as well as books of regional interest. Laurier Press also provides publishing services to scholarly associations and journals.

History
The Press was founded in 1974 as a non-profit enterprise. They publish 20-25 titles per year and have 800 physical titles in print and digital formats. WLUP has been typesetting books from electronic files since 1984, and was one of the first publishers to have a web presence in 1994.

Wilfrid Laurier University Press distributes titles for the Laurier Centre for Military, Strategic and Disarmament Studies, Toronto International Film Festival (in Canada) and the Cress Board of Health and Social Services of James Bay. WLUP is represented in the trade market by in Canada by Ampersand Inc., in the United States by Ingram Academic, and around the world by Eurospan. Wilfrid Laurier University Press is a member of the Association of University Presses, the Association of Canadian University Presses (and through them, the International Publishers Association), the Association of Canadian Publishers, and the Organization of Book Publishers of Ontario.

References

External links 
Wilfrid Laurier University Press
Scholars Commons @ Laurier

Press
University presses of Canada
Publishing companies established in 1974
Literary publishing companies